"Baby Don't Do It" is the debut, 1953 single by The "5" Royales.  The single made it to number one for three weeks on the R&B National Best Sellers chart, and was their first of two number one singles for the group.  
The popularity of "Baby Don't Do It" gave origin to several answer records.

References
 

1953 singles
The "5" Royales songs
Songs written by Lowman Pauling